Liam Tindall (born 27 September 2001) is a professional rugby league footballer who plays as a er for the Bradford Bulls in the RFL Championship, on DR loan from Leeds Rhinos in the Super League.

Career

2020
Tindall made his Super League debut in round 14 of the 2020 Super League season for Leeds against the Catalans Dragons.

Tindall scored his first Super League try in round 17 vs St Helens.

References

External links
Leeds Rhinos profile

2001 births
Living people
Bradford Bulls players
England Knights national rugby league team players
English rugby league players
Leeds Rhinos players
Rugby league wingers
Rugby league players from Leeds